Joseph Kamwendo (born 23 October 1986) is a retired Malawian international footballer. He is now coaching Walter Nyamilandu Football Academy.

Career
Kamwendo was the first foreigner to be bestowed the Soccer Star of the Year in Zimbabwe. In 2005, he received the award as a player of CAPS United.

In November 2013, he joined TP Mazembe on a five-year deal.

On 23 December 2019, 33-year old Kamwendo announced his retirement from football.

External links

See also
 List of men's footballers with 100 or more international caps

References

1986 births
Living people
People from Blantyre
Malawian footballers
Malawian expatriate footballers
Malawi international footballers
2010 Africa Cup of Nations players
FC Nordsjælland players
Orlando Pirates F.C. players
TP Mazembe players
Mighty Wanderers FC players
CAPS United players
Vasco da Gama (South Africa) players
Liga Desportiva de Maputo players
CS Don Bosco players
National First Division players
South African Premier Division players
Danish Superliga players
Association football midfielders
FIFA Century Club
Malawian expatriate sportspeople in South Africa
Malawian expatriate sportspeople in the Democratic Republic of the Congo
Malawian expatriate sportspeople in Mozambique
Expatriate men's footballers in Denmark
Expatriate footballers in Zimbabwe
Expatriate soccer players in South Africa
Expatriate footballers in the Democratic Republic of the Congo